Dino Bruni (born 13 April 1932) is an Italian road racing cyclist who won the silver medal in the men's team road race at the 1952 Summer Olympics, alongside Vincenzo Zucconelli and Gianni Ghidini. Italy's fourth rider Bruno Monti also crossed the line, but did not receive a medal because just the first three counted for the final classification. Bruni also represented his native country at the 1956 Summer Olympics in Melbourne, Australia. After his amateur career, he was a professional rider from 1956 to 1965. He won three stages in the Tour de France, and two stages in the Giro d'Italia.

Major results

1957
Vezzola
1958
Capri
1959
Tre Valli Varesine
Trofeo Fenaroli
Tour de France:
Winner stages 4 and 16
1960
Rovigo
Alessandrino
San Marino
Giro d'Italia:
Winner stages 1 and 17
1961
Coppa Sabatini
Giro della Provincia di Reggio Calabria
1962
Arras
GP Tarentaise Briançon
Tour de France:
Winner stage 21
1963
Coppa Sabatini
1969
Alessandrino

References

External links 

Official Tour de France results for Dino Bruni

1932 births
Living people
Italian male cyclists
Cyclists at the 1952 Summer Olympics
Cyclists at the 1956 Summer Olympics
Olympic cyclists of Italy
Olympic silver medalists for Italy
Italian Tour de France stage winners
Italian Giro d'Italia stage winners
Sportspeople from the Province of Ferrara
Olympic medalists in cycling
Tour de Suisse stage winners
Cyclists from Emilia-Romagna
Medalists at the 1952 Summer Olympics